Troy Edward Glaus (born August 3, 1976) is an American former professional baseball first baseman and third baseman. Glaus played in Major League Baseball with the Anaheim Angels (–), Arizona Diamondbacks, Toronto Blue Jays (–), St. Louis Cardinals (–), and the Atlanta Braves. Glaus lettered in baseball while attending UCLA. He won a bronze medal in baseball at the 1996 Summer Olympics as a member of the U.S. national baseball team.

Professional career
In thirteen seasons Glaus hit .254 with 320 home runs and 950 RBI in 1537 games. In 19 postseason games, he hit .347 with nine home runs and 16 RBI. Glaus has been selected to four All-Star Games, three with the Angels and one with the Blue Jays.

Anaheim Angels

Glaus participated in the 2001 MLB All-Star Game and posted his second consecutive 40 home run season with 41 on the year.

In , Glaus failed to reach the 40 home run club for the first time since the 1999 season, but he managed to hit thirty home runs in helping the Angels make the playoffs for the first time in 16 years. The Angels beat the San Francisco Giants in 7 games in the 2002 World Series to win their first world championship title in team history. Glaus was awarded the World Series MVP award as he hit .385 with three home runs and eight RBIs and hit a go-ahead double in Game 6 to finish a five-run comeback for the Angels.

Glaus missed much of the  season with a shoulder injury. 2004 was the last year of his contract with the Angels. As an established veteran, he was in demand on the free agent market and able to field lucrative offers for long term contracts. Although Glaus had spent his entire career an Angel, and was a fan favorite, the team decided not to pursue Glaus' return. Amid concerns about Glaus' future health after his injury, the team decided to go with the much lower-priced alternative of turning the third base position over to young prospect Dallas McPherson, whom they felt had a good chance to soon become as productive as Glaus had been.

Arizona Diamondbacks
Glaus ultimately signed with the Arizona Diamondbacks for US$45 million over four years. He worked through his back problems in the  season with the Diamondbacks, hitting 37 home runs with 97 RBIs. He also led the league in adjusted range factor (2.92), but his 24 errors tied him with David Wright for the most errors by a third baseman in the Major Leagues, and he had a Major League-low .946 fielding percentage at third.

Toronto Blue Jays

After the 2005 season, Glaus was traded to the Toronto Blue Jays in the off-season along with minor league shortstop Sergio Santos. The trade sent pitcher Miguel Batista and second baseman Orlando Hudson to the Diamondbacks. The Jays badly needed a power bat a year after letting go of Carlos Delgado, however the emergence of Hudson at second base gave the statistical advantage of this trade to the Diamondbacks. Although Glaus was converted from shortstop to third base in the minors (and played 10 games at shortstop for the Angels), he started at shortstop for the Toronto Blue Jays against the Chicago White Sox on May 26,  due to the demotion of shortstop Russ Adams. Glaus was not expected to do much fielding due to the fact the pitcher that day was known to induce many fly balls, instead of ground balls.  This defensive alignment didn't affect his hitting, collecting 2 hits with a home run. Since then, Glaus made several starts at shortstop, usually when Toronto was facing National League opponents at their home ballpark, where there is no DH.

After hitting 38 home runs and 104 RBI in the 2006 season, Glaus earned a single 10th place vote for the 2006 American League MVP Award.

In 2006, Glaus had the lowest zone rating of any Major League third baseman (.741).

In  Glaus's production was hampered all year by foot injuries and his production fell.

On December 13, 2007, he was cited in the Mitchell Report.

St. Louis Cardinals
Glaus was traded to the St. Louis Cardinals in exchange for fellow third baseman Scott Rolen on January 14, 2008. This worked out well for the Cardinals, as Glaus did about as well as, or better than, his career rates in most offensive categories. Furthermore, Glaus committed only 7 errors in 146 games and led the league with a .982 fielding percentage at 3B.

On September 3, 2008, he hit his 300th career home run off Doug Davis of the Arizona Diamondbacks in the third inning.

He underwent arthroscopic right shoulder surgery on January 21, . The Cardinals initially expected him to be ready around the start of 2009 season, but after a setback in his rehabilitation he was placed on the 15-day DL; after another reassessment the Cardinals announced that they did not expect him to return until June 2009. On July 11, 2009 he was assigned to the  Palm Beach Cardinals of the Florida State League on a rehabilitation assignment. He returned September 2, against the Brewers in the bottom of the 6th inning.

Atlanta Braves
Following an injury-shortened 2009 season with the St. Louis Cardinals, Glaus signed a one-year $1.75 million contract with the Atlanta Braves, a deal that allowed him to earn an additional $2.25 million in performance and roster bonuses. He became the starting first baseman in 2010.

After a rough April in which he hit below the Mendoza Line, Glaus rebounded to become Player of the Month in May, hitting .330 with 6 home runs and 28 RBI.  As of August 9, Glaus was hitting .242 with 14 home runs and 63 RBI.

Glaus's production faltered in July and August. After Atlanta acquired Derrek Lee on August 18 to play first base, Glaus was placed on the DL with knee fatigue. Glaus had a few setbacks, but returned to Atlanta in a back-up role behind Derrek Lee and rookie Freddie Freeman.

Glaus made only one appearance at third base during the regular season, but was used at third in game 2 of the NLDS against the San Francisco Giants starting a key double play. Glaus then started game four of the series at third.

Post-playing career
Glaus became a candidate for induction into the National Baseball Hall of Fame and Museum for the first time on November 9, 2015. He received no votes.

Personal life
Glaus relocated to San Diego in 2020, with his wife, Ann. He also has one son, Ty.

See also

 List of Major League Baseball career assists as a third baseman leaders
 List of Major League Baseball career games played as a third baseman leaders
 List of Major League Baseball career home run leaders
 List of Major League Baseball players named in the Mitchell Report
 List of Olympic medalists in baseball
 Los Angeles Angels award winners and league leaders

References

External links

 , or Retrosheet, or Behind the Dugout, or St. Louis Cardinals Scout, or Pura Pelota (Venezuelan Winter League)
 
 

1976 births
Living people
American expatriate baseball players in Canada
American League All-Stars
American League home run champions
Anaheim Angels players
Arizona Diamondbacks players
Atlanta Braves players
Baseball players at the 1996 Summer Olympics
Baseball players from Los Angeles
Gwinnett Braves players
Major League Baseball third basemen
Medalists at the 1996 Summer Olympics
Memphis Redbirds players
Midland Angels players
Olympic bronze medalists for the United States in baseball
Palm Beach Cardinals players
People from Tarzana, Los Angeles
Rancho Cucamonga Quakes players
Silver Slugger Award winners
Sportspeople from Orange County, California
Springfield Cardinals players
St. Louis Cardinals players
Tiburones de La Guaira players
American expatriate baseball players in Venezuela
Toronto Blue Jays players
UCLA Bruins baseball players
University of California, Los Angeles alumni
Vancouver Canadians players
World Series Most Valuable Player Award winners